The 2020 Summer Olympics men's park skateboarding competitions took place on August 5, 2021 at the Ariake Urban Sports Park in Tokyo, Japan.

Competition format 
The twenty participating skateboarders were sorted into four heats of five skaters each for the semifinals (prelims). During the semifinals, each skater did three 45-second runs in their designated heat. The best run score of each skater's three runs built a ranking. The eight top-ranked skaters from the combined ranking of the heats qualified for the final.

Results

Semifinals 
The top 8 skateboarders of 20 advanced to the final.

Final 
The results of the final were:

See also
Skateboarding at the 2020 Summer Olympics – Men's street
Cycling at the 2020 Summer Olympics – Men's BMX freestyle

References

Skateboarding at the 2020 Summer Olympics
Men's events at the 2020 Summer Olympics